Kharan district is a district in the Balochistan province of Pakistan.

Demographics
At the time of the 2017 census the district had a population of 162,766, of which 84,631 were males and 78,135 females. Rural population was 111,378 (68.43%) while the urban population was 51,388 (31.57%). The literacy rate was 40.93% - the male literacy rate was 55.42% while the female literacy rate was 25.47%. 595 people in the district were from religious minorities.

At the time of the 2017 census, 81.49% of the population spoke Balochi and 16.88% Brahui as their first language.

Education 
According to the Pakistan District Education Rankings 2017, district Kharan is ranked at number 110 out of the 141 ranked districts in Pakistan on the education score index. This index considers learning, gender parity and retention in the district.

Literacy rate in 2014–15 of population 10 years and older in the district stands at 44% whereas for females it is only 27%.

Post primary access is a major issue in the district with 78% schools being at primary level. Compare this with high schools which constitute only 8% of government schools in the district. This is also reflected in the enrolment figures for 2016–17 with 6,987 students enrolled in class 1 to 5 and only 170 students enrolled in class 9 and 10.

Gender disparity is another issue in the district. Only 26% schools in the district are girls’ schools. Access to education for girls is a major issue in the district and is also reflected in the low literacy rates for females.

Moreover, the schools in the district lack basic facilities. According to Alif Ailaan district education rankings 2017, the district is ranked at number 141 out of the 155 districts of Pakistan for primary school infrastructure. At the middle school level, it is ranked at number 126 out of the 155 districts. These rankings take into account the basic facilities available in schools including drinking water, working toilet, availability of electricity, existence of a boundary wall and general building condition. Approximately 4 out of 5 schools do not have electricity in them. 1 out 3 schools lack a toilet and 3 out of 5 do not have a boundary wall. About 1 out of 2 schools do not have clean drinking water.

See also
 Kharan (princely state)
 Qila Ladgasht
 Nausherwani tombs

References

External links

 Kharan District at www.balochistan.gov.pk
 Kharan District  at www.balochistanpolice.gov.pk

 
Nuclear test sites
Pakistani nuclear test sites
Project-706
Nuclear history of Pakistan
Districts of Pakistan
Districts of Balochistan, Pakistan